University of the Arts or University of Arts may refer to:

 University of the Arts (Philadelphia) in Philadelphia, Pennsylvania, United States
 University of the Arts London in London, England, United Kingdom

China
 Jilin University of Arts in China
 Nanjing University of the Arts in China

Germany
 Berlin University of the Arts
 University of the Arts Bremen
 Folkwang University of the Arts in the Ruhr Area
 Karlsruhe University of Arts and Design

Japan
 Kyoto City University of Arts
 Kyoto Saga University of Arts
 Kyoto University of the Arts
 Nagoya University of Arts
 Osaka University of Arts
 Tokyo University of the Arts

Romania
 Bucharest National University of Arts
 George Enescu National University of Arts

Switzerland
 University of the Arts Bern
 Zurich University of the Arts

Taiwan
 National Taiwan University of Arts in New Taipei
 Taipei National University of the Arts in Taipei City
 Tainan National University of the Arts

Other countries
 University of Arts, Tirana (formerly Academy of Arts in Tirana) in Albania 
 Universidad Nacional de las Artes in Buenos Aires, Argentina
 University of Art and Design Linz in Austria
 Alberta University of the Arts in Calgary, Alberta, Canada
 University of the Arts Helsinki in Finland
 Iceland University of the Arts in Reykjavík, Iceland
 Isfahan University of Art in Iran
 Amsterdam University of the Arts in the Netherlands
 Magdalena Abakanowicz University of the Arts Poznan in Poland
 University of Arts in Belgrade in Serbia
 Korea National University of Arts in Seoul, South Korea
 Stockholm University of the Arts in Sweden
 Norwich University of the Arts in Norfolk, United Kingdom

See also